Carrigvore at , is the 111th–highest peak in Ireland on the Arderin scale, and the 134th–highest peak on the Vandeleur-Lynam scale. Carrigvore is in the middle section of the Wicklow Mountains, in Ireland, and is part of a large north-east to south-west "boggy ridge" that runs from the Sally Gap to Carrigvore, and then on to Gravale ; after a col, the ridge continues south-westwards to meet Duff Hill , which is part of the larger massif of Mullaghcleevaun .

See also
Wicklow Way
Wicklow Mountains
Lists of mountains in Ireland
List of mountains of the British Isles by height
List of Hewitt mountains in England, Wales and Ireland

References 
Citations

Bibliography

External links
MountainViews: The Irish Mountain Website, Carrigvore
MountainViews: Irish Online Mountain Database
The Database of British and Irish Hills , the largest database of British Isles mountains ("DoBIH")
Hill Bagging UK & Ireland, the searchable interface for the DoBIH

Mountains and hills of County Wicklow
Hewitts of Ireland
Mountains under 1000 metres